Heroes is the fourth studio album by synthwave band The Midnight. It was released on September 9, 2022 by Counter Records.

Background
The album includes songs that are influenced by hair metal bands and heavy metal, specifically Def Leppard and Mutt Lange. The band confirmed the album was a follow-up to their 2020 album Monsters, which is also part of a trilogy of albums starting with their 2018 release Kids.

Track listing
All songs are written by Tyler Lyle and Tim McEwan, except where noted.
"Golden Gate" – 6:04
"Brooklyn. Friday. Love." (Lyle, McEwan, Nikki Flores) – 3:52
"Heartbeat" (Lyle, McEwan, Royce Whittaker, Flores) – 3:50
"A Place of Her Own" – 5:33
"Heroes" (Lyle, McEwan, Whittaker, Leila Broussard) – 5:13
"Heart Worth Breaking" – 5:07
"Loved by You" – 3:44
"Aerostar" (Lyle, McEwan, Whittaker) – 4:55
"Change Your Heart or Die"	 – 3:31
"Avalanche" (Lyle, McEwan, Jessie Frye) – 4:27
"Souvenir" (Lyle, McEwan, Whittaker) – 3:34
"Photograph" – 2:37
"Energy Never Dies, It Just Transforms" – 4:20

Charts

References

2022 albums
The Midnight albums